Matthias Werner Hentze (born 25 January 1960 in Wiedenbrück, Germany) is a German scientist. He is the director of the European Molecular Biology Laboratory (EMBL), co-director of the Molecular Medicine Partnership Unit between EMBL and Heidelberg University, and Professor of Molecular Medicine at Heidelberg University.

Biography 
Matthias Hentze studied medicine in the UK at the medical schools at the universities of Southampton, Oxford, Glasgow and Cambridge, and in Germany at the Westfälische Wilhelms-Universität, Münster from which he qualified in 1984. In the same year, he received his M.D. degree for a dissertation on the role of glycosylation in lysosomal enzyme expression with Kurt von Figura as his advisor.

After a short phase of clinical work Hentze became a postdoctoral fellow at the National Institutes of Health (Bethesda, Maryland, USA) in 1985, having been awarded a fellowship by the German Research Foundation (DFG). In 1989, he joined the European Molecular Biology Laboratory in Heidelberg as an independent group leader. At the age of 30, he obtained the Habilitation from the Ruprecht-Karls University in Heidelberg and was appointed Dean of the EMBL International Ph.D. Programme in 1996.

Together with Andreas Kulozik of the Medical Faculty of Heidelberg University, Hentze co-founded the Molecular Medicine Partnership Unit (MMPU) in 2002 and serves as its co-director. The MMPU represents the first institutional partnership between EMBL and a national research institution and is devoted to interdisciplinary research at the interface between molecular biology and clinical medicine.

In 2005, Hentze became Associate Director of the EMBL and Professor for Molecular Medicine at the University of Heidelberg. In 2013, Hentze was appointed Director of EMBL, advising and supporting EMBL's Director General,Prof. Edith Heard.

Work

Research 
Hentze's research focuses on RNA biology and RNA-binding proteins. In 1987, Hentze and his colleagues discovered iron-responsive elements as first example of an RNA element regulating the translation of mammalian mRNA into proteins. Hentze's research group has paved the way for understanding translational control (RNA-binding proteins, microRNAs) whose significance for developmental biology, brain function, carcinogenesis and other diseases has in the meantime become widely recognized. Moreover, he has made key discoveries in the area of iron metabolism and disease.

In 2010, Hentze proposed the concept of REM Networks, a new interconnection between metabolism and gene expression on the basis of RNA-binding proteins. The research project was awarded the ERC Advanced Investigator Grant by the European Research Council in 2011. Work following this hypothesis led to the development of the "RNA Interactome Capture" technique and to the discovery of hundreds of formerly unknown RNA-binding proteins in the cells of living organisms from human to yeast, including more than 50 metabolic enzymes. Hentze and his colleagues also discovered new RNA-binding motives of proteins which they unraveled using the newly developed method called "RBDmap". 

In 2019, they described the concept of riboregulation. They found out that the autophagy receptor protein p62 is directly regulated by a small RNA, vtRNA1-1, and that the small RNA directly interferes with protein-protein interactions between p62 monomers. They reported a new form of riboregulation in 2022: RNA binds to the catalytic center of the human enzyme enolase-1 and inhibits its glycolytic activity. Currently, their research focuses on how widely biological processes are riboregulated, and how riboregulation determines cell metabolism, differentiation and malignant processes.

Administrative activities 
Since 1996, Hentze has held positions in EMBL's scientific administration, initially as Dean of the EMBL International PhD Programme and in the establishment and expansion of EMBL's internal and external training programs. He played a key role in the construction and establishment of the Advanced Training Centre (ATC) in Heidelberg. He is also responsible for developing EMBL's fundraising programs as well as the alumni program, and established EMBL's first Bioethics Committee, which he chaired from 2004 to 2020.

Hentze founded the Environmental Research Initiative (ERI) in 2020. Focused on globally networked, interdisciplinary research in the life sciences, ERI connects the commitment of private donors with the scientific potential of researchers at EMBL to uncover new approaches to solve environmental problems.

Honors and awards 
 1997 — Elected member of the European Molecular Biology Organization (EMBO)
 2000 — Gottfried Wilhelm Leibniz Prize of the German Research Foundation (DFG)
 2006 — Elected Member of the German National Academy of Sciences Leopoldina
 2007 — Lautenschläger Research Prize of the University of Heidelberg
 2012 — ERC Advanced Investigator Grant of the European Research Council
 2015 — RNA Society, Elected Director (2016–2017)
 2015 — Feodor Lynen Medal and Lecture, German Society for Biochemistry and Molecular Biology
 2016 — Elected Corresponding Member (FAA), Australian Academy of Science
 2016 — Heidelberg Molecular Life Science Investigator Award 
 2016 — Elected Member, Academia Europaea (MAE)
 2017 — Doctor of Science, honoris causa, Australia National University, Canberra, Australia
 2018 — Ilse and Helmut Wachter Award of the Medical University Innsbruck
 2018 — International Honorary Member of the American Academy of Arts and Sciences
 2019 — Pro Scientia Award of the Eckhart-Buddecke-Foundation, Münster, Germany
2020 — RNA Society Lifetime Achievement Award 
 2023 — The Centenary Award of the Biochemical Society

Editorial boards 
Hentze serves or served on the editorial boards of Molecular Cell, RNA, EMBO Molecular Medicine, Trends in Biochemical Sciences, Journal of Molecular Medicine, BMC Molecular Biology, and Wiley Interdisciplinary Reviews: RNA.

Other activities
Hentze is or was a member of the Scientific Advisory Board and Board of Trustees of the Max Delbrück Center for Molecular Medicine (Berlin, Germany), the scientific advisory board of the Berlin Institute of Health (BIH/BIG), the Istituto Nazionale Genetica Molecolare (INGM) (Milano, Italy), the Centenary Institute (Sydney, Australia), the KAUST Smart Health Initiative, and the Cold Spring Harbor Conferences Asia. Furthermore, Hentze is the scientific co-founder of Anadys Pharmaceuticals (San Diego, USA).

Publications
Hentze is (co-)author of textbooks about Molecular Medicine and has published over 300 scientific original contributions.

References

1960 births
Living people
University of Münster alumni
21st-century German biologists
Gottfried Wilhelm Leibniz Prize winners
Fellows of the Australian Academy of Science